iShares S&P 100 Index Fund is an exchange-traded fund of US stocks. The fund tracks the S&P 100 index.

Its ticker is OEF.

Holdings

Top ten holdings:

 Apple Inc. (AAPL)
 Exxon Mobil Corp. (XOM)
 International Business Machines (IBM)
 AT&T Inc. (T)
 Microsoft Corp. (MSFT)
 Citigroup Inc. (C)
 Chevron Corp. (CVX)
 Johnson & Johnson (JNJ)
 Coca-Cola Co. (KO)
 Pfizer Inc. (PFE)

(as of June 2012)

Competitors

iShares S&P 100 mainly competes with S&P 500 funds, including SPDR S&P 500, iShares Core S&P 500, and Vanguard S&P 500 ETF. Those funds are not mega; one fund that is more similar is Guggenheim Russell Top 50 Mega Cap.

See also

iShares S&P Global 100

References

External links

iShares S&P 100 ETF
MarketWatch page for OEF

Exchange-traded funds
S&P Dow Jones Indices